Giulio Aleni (1582– 10 June 1649), in Chinese , was an Italian Jesuit missionary and scholar. He was born in Leno near Brescia in Italy, at the time part of the Republic of Venice, and died at Yanping in China. He became a member of the Society of Jesus in 1600 and distinguished himself in his knowledge of mathematics and theology. He is known for helping publish the Zhifang Waiji, an atlas in Chinese. Giulio Aleni also wrote a treatise criticizing the Ming dynasty, the Ming emperors and their elites, and their mistakes and errors. Near the end of his life, the Ming dynasty eventually got destroyed and replaced by the Qing dynasty founded by the House of Aisin-Gioro.

Life
In  1610, he was sent as a missionary to China. While waiting at Macau for a favorable opportunity to enter the country he taught mathematics to local scholars and published his "Observation sur l'éclipse de lune du 8 Novembre 1612, faite a Macao" (Mémoires de l'Acad. des Sciences, VII, 706).

He adopted the dress and manners of the country, was the first Christian missionary in Jiangxi, and built several churches in Fujian. One of his converts, Li Jiubiao, recorded the responses of Aleni and Andrius Rudamina, one of his fellow Jesuits, to the questions and speculations of his parishioners and compiled them into a journal.

Works
He published works in Chinese on a variety of topics. His cosmography, Wanwu Zhenyuan (萬物真原; The True Origin of the Ten-thousand Things), was translated into Manchu during the reign of the Kangxi Emperor (Wanwu Zhenyuan translated in Manchu script:  Wylie: Tumen chakai unengki sekiyen, Möllendorff: Tumen jakai unengki sekiyen). A copy was sent from Beijing to Paris in 1789. He completed the work of earlier Jesuit scholars to produce the Zhifang waiji, a global atlas written in Chinese and one of the first to include the Americas. 

Among his most important religious works are a controversial treatise on the Catholic Faith, in which are refuted what he saw as the principal errors of the Ming dynasty; and The Life of God, the Saviour, from the Four Gospels (Peking, 1635–1637, 8 vols.; often reprinted, e.g. in 1887 in 3 vols) and used even by Protestant missionaries.

Legacy
The life and works of Giulio Aleni are the subject of several conferences in 1994 and 2010. Two of his books, Life of Matteo Ricci, Xitai of the West and Holy images of the Heavenly Lord have been presented to the public by Fondazione Civiltà Bresciana in two separate occasions, on 13 and 25 October 2010.

References

Citations

Bibliography
 Menegon, Eugenio. "Un solo Cielo. Giulio Aleni S.J.  (1582-1649). Geografia, arte, scienza, religione dall’Europa alla Cina". Brescia: Grafo, 1994.
 John Witek, S.J. "Aleni, Giulio, in Gerald Anderson, ed., Biographical Dictionary of Christian Missions (Erdmans, 1999), pp. 9–10  
 Lippiello, Tiziana, and Roman Malek. Scholar from the West: Giulio Aleni S.J. (1582-1649) and the Dialogue between Christianity and China. Brescia: Sankt Augustin: Fondazione civiltà bresciana; Monumenta Serica Institute, 1997.
Sommervogel, Carlos, Bibliothèque de la Campagnie de Jesus, I, 157 sq.
Pfister, S.J., Bibliogr. des Jesuites Chinois miss.
Cordier, Essai d'une bibliogr. des ouvr. publ. en Chine par les Europeéns (Paris 1883).
ALENI, Giulio, Geografia dei paesi stranieri alla Cina. Zhifang waiji, with translation (Italian), Introduction and commentary by Paolo De Troia, Brescia, Fondazione Civiltà Bresciana/Centro Giulio Aleni, 2009, with a full Map of ten thousand countries (Wangguo quantu)
Ahn Jaewon, A comparative research on Cicero's orator perfectus and Confucius' rex perfectus( Papers on Rhetoric 10)
 Song, Gang. Giulio Aleni, Kouduo richao, and Christian-Confucian Dialogism in Late Ming Fujian (艾儒略、「口鐸日抄」及晚明福建的耶儒對話主義), Monumenta Serica Monograph Series LXIX. Abingdon, Oxon – New York: Routledge, 2018.
Attribution:

External links
 Life and passion of Christ. Digital facsimile of Aleni's ca. 1640 printing from Houghton Library, Harvard University.

1582 births
1649 deaths
Religious leaders from Brescia
17th-century Italian historians
17th-century Italian Roman Catholic theologians
Jesuit missionaries in China
17th-century Italian astronomers
17th-century Italian Jesuits
Jesuit scientists
Scientists from Brescia